Broadford Parish Church, Skye is a parish church in the Church of Scotland in Broadford, Skye.

History

The church was built between 1839 and 1841, and replaced the 16th century church of Cill Chriosd. Broadford church has round headed windows, a pedimented bellcote and a flat Tudor doorpiece.

Repairs were made in 1884, and the interior was altered in the 1930s.

References

Church of Scotland churches in Scotland
Churches in the Isle of Skye
Churches completed in 1841